Kaibu (pronounced ) is an island in Fiji's Lau archipelago.  A 22.4 kilometer-long reef encompasses Kaibu and the neighbouring island of Yacata, from which Kaibu is separated by a lagoon.  The island, which has an area of about 2 square kilometers, is located 56 kilometers west of Vanua Balavu.  Fishing, snorkeling, and water sports are among the tourist attractions of the island.

The island is privately owned by James Jannard, the founder of Oakley Inc.

Islands of Fiji
Lau Islands
Private islands of Fiji